Holidays with Pay (Agriculture) Convention, 1952 is  an International Labour Organization Convention.

It was established in 1952, with the preamble stating:
Having decided upon the adoption of certain proposals with regard to holidays with pay in agriculture,...

Revision 
The principles contained in the convention were subsequently revised and included in the ILO Convention C132, Holidays with Pay Convention (Revised), 1970.

Ratifications
As of 2013, the convention had been ratified by 46 states. Of the ratifying states, 12 had denounced the treaty by an automatic process which denounces the 1952 convention when the state ratifies a superseding treaty.

External links 
Text.
Ratifications.

Leave of absence
International Labour Organization conventions
Holidays
Treaties concluded in 1952
Treaties entered into force in 1954
Agricultural treaties
Treaties of Algeria
Treaties of Antigua and Barbuda
Treaties of Austria
Treaties of Barbados
Treaties of Belize
Treaties of Burundi
Treaties of the Central African Republic
Treaties of Colombia
Treaties of Costa Rica
Treaties of the Comoros
Treaties of Cuba
Treaties of Djibouti
Treaties of Ecuador
Treaties of the Republic of Egypt (1953–1958)
Treaties of the French Fourth Republic
Treaties of Gabon
Treaties of Guatemala
Treaties of Israel
Treaties of Mauritania
Treaties of Morocco
Treaties of the Netherlands
Treaties of New Zealand
Treaties of Paraguay
Treaties of Peru
Treaties of the Polish People's Republic
Treaties of Saint Lucia
Treaties of Saint Vincent and the Grenadines
Treaties of Senegal
Treaties of Sierra Leone
Treaties of Francoist Spain
Treaties of Suriname
Treaties of Eswatini
Treaties of the United Arab Republic
Treaties of Tanganyika
Treaties extended to the Netherlands Antilles
Treaties extended to Aruba
Treaties extended to Surinam (Dutch colony)
Treaties extended to French Guiana
Treaties extended to Guadeloupe
Treaties extended to Martinique
Treaties extended to Réunion
Treaties extended to the West Indies Federation
Treaties extended to British Honduras
Treaties extended to the Isle of Man
Treaties extended to British Mauritius
Treaties extended to the Crown Colony of Singapore
Treaties extended to Swaziland (protectorate)
Treaties extended to Tanganyika (territory)
Treaties extended to British Hong Kong
1952 in labor relations